Vitis adenoclada is a species of plant in the grape family. It is found in the province of Hunan in China, where the climate is temperate.

References

adenoclada
Plants described in 1925
Flora of China